Abdoul-Razak "Razak" Boukari (born 25 April 1987) is a Togolese professional footballer who plays as a winger.

He progressed from Châteauroux to play top-level football in France for both Lens and Rennes, before joining Wolverhampton Wanderers in 2012. In 2016, he returned to Châteauroux, playing for the club until 2022.

Club career

Early days
Boukari began his career with Châteauroux, for whom his father Sadou also played. He made his professional debut during the 2004–05 season in Ligue 2, ending the campaign with two goals from his fourteen appearances. In the following season he became regular player and caught the eye of several top division clubs, such as Nantes, Lille and Monaco.

Ligue 1 moves
In June 2006 he signed a five-year contract with Lens of Ligue 1. He played 29 league games for Lens in his first year and 19 in his second season but could not prevent the club from being relegated. Promised more playing time, Boukari remained after relegation to be part of the team that won promotion back to the top flight as Ligue 2 champions in 2009–10.

In January 2011 he left Lens to sign for fellow Ligue 1 club Rennes for €4.5 million in a four-and-a-half-year deal. He scored four goals for his new club in 18 games, most of them as a starter, before injury kept him out for the remainder of the season.

However, he lost his starting position during the following campaign to Jonathan Pitroipa. This situation was compounded by suffering from a torn left thigh injury in January 2012, which kept Boukari on the sidelines for four weeks. He did though manage 20 appearances for the club, 13 of them as a substitute and scored three goals as Rennes finished in 6th place.

Wolverhampton Wanderers
Boukari moved to Wolverhampton Wanderers of the Football League Championship on 27 August 2012, signing a four-year deal for an undisclosed fee. Only weeks before, Boukari had spent time on trial at newly promoted Premier League side West Ham United, but they instead opted to buy Wolverhampton Wanderers winger Matt Jarvis, opening up a position at Wolverhampton Wanderers for Boukari to eventually fill.

After a promising start to the season, Boukari was substituted during a 1–0 win over Sheffield Wednesday on 29 September 2012, after suffering a calf injury. It was subsequently reported that he would be out of action for three to six weeks, but it was later reported he wouldn't be fit until Autumn 2013.

On 12 August 2013, Ligue 1 side Sochaux announced that Boukari was to spend a week on trial with them, with a view to a season-long loan deal. Although it was reported after this initial week that the player could not agree terms, on 27 August, a loan deal to cover the 2013–14 season was completed. His time with Sochaux was again impaired by injury problems, making only ten appearances (all as substitute), as the team suffered relegation.

International career
Boukari, who holds dual citizenship with Togo and France, made his France U21 debut against Sweden on 14 November 2006. In July 2010, he confirmed with the Togolese Football Federation to represent Togo thereafter. From 2010 to 2018, Boukari played for the Togo national team.

Career statistics

Club

International goals
Scores and results list Togo's goal tally first, score column indicates score after each Boukari goal.

Honours
Lens
 Ligue 2: 2008–09
 Coupe de la Ligue runner-up: 2008
Châteauroux

 Championnat National: 2016–17

France U21
 Toulon Tournament: 2007

References

External links

FFF national team stats. 

1987 births
Living people
Sportspeople from Lomé
Togolese footballers
Togo international footballers
French footballers
France youth international footballers
France under-21 international footballers
French sportspeople of Togolese descent
Togolese Muslims
Black French sportspeople
Association football wingers
Ligue 2 players
Ligue 1 players
English Football League players
Championnat National 2 players
Championnat National players
Championnat National 3 players
LB Châteauroux players
RC Lens players
Stade Rennais F.C. players
FC Sochaux-Montbéliard players
Wolverhampton Wanderers F.C. players
Togolese expatriate footballers
French expatriate footballers
Expatriate footballers in England
2017 Africa Cup of Nations players
Togolese expatriate sportspeople in England
French expatriate sportspeople in England